Jerry Clark may refer to:

 Jerome Clark (born 1946), American researcher and writer
 Jerry Clark (American football) (born 1932), American football player and coach
 Jerry Clark (politician), delegate for the Maryland House of Delegates
 Jerry Clark (music executive) philanthropist, on-air personality and music executive.